The 'Women's javelin throw F33–34/52–53 had its Final held on September 13 at 17:00.

Medalists

Results

References
Final

Athletics at the 2008 Summer Paralympics
2008 in women's athletics